Bhale Pellam ( What a Wife) is a 1994 Telugu-language drama film directed by A. Kranthi Kumar. It stars Jagapathi Babu, Meena  and music composed by Deva. The film was produced by V. Doraswamy Raju under the VMC Productions banner. The film was a remake of the Tamil film Purusha Lakshanam (1993).

Plot
The film begins with Nanda Gopal / Nandu an industrialist. Bharati is an impish girl who has know no bounds for her devilishness. Raja the fellow collegian of Bharati, is the malice that aspires to possess her. Nandu provides high esteem to his manager as he nurtured him. The manager wishes to knit his daughter Anjali with Nandu. Destiny makes Bharati & Anjali besties. Once in celebration of Anjali's birthday, Bharati sees Nandu and falls for him. Therefrom, Bharati chases and perturbs Nandu with her annoyance to receive his love. After a few comic incidents, he too crushes, and they wedlock. It begrudges Raja and seeks vengeance. At one time, Nandu gets out of town, and utilizing it, Raja ploys to create a rift between the pair. So, he visits their home and hugs Bharati. Suddenly, Nandu returns, views it, and he suspects Bharati who expels her. 

Besides, Raja magnifies the situation and increases the rupture. So, anguished Nandu turns into an alcoholic and appeals for divorce. At that point, Anjali decides to approach Nandu for resolving the problem which everyone hinders as he is in an ire mood. After a heated argument, Anjali moves from there. Exploiting it, Raja slaughters Anjali by pushing her from the terrace and incriminates Nandu. During that plight, Bharati stands in for her husband. Fortuitously, the crime scene is captured by Bharati's friend Madhavan Nair a photographer, which is detected by him and rushes towards Bharati. Raja forcibly grabs it and attempts to rape Bharati. Thus, enraged Bharati slays him and produces the evidence before the judiciary. At last, the court acquits Nandu as guiltless. Finally, the movie ends on a happy note with the reunion of the couple.

Cast

Soundtrack

Music composed by Deva. Lyrics written by Veturi. Music released on VMG CASSETTES Company.

References

External links 
 

1994 films
1990s Telugu-language films
Indian romantic drama films
1994 romantic drama films
Indian courtroom films
Films scored by Deva (composer)
Telugu remakes of Tamil films
Films directed by Kranthi Kumar